Trzeszczany  is a village in Hrubieszów County, Lublin Voivodeship, in eastern Poland. It is the seat of the gmina (administrative district) called Gmina Trzeszczany.

The village has a population of 655.

References

Trzeszczany